The 2014–15 Irish Premier League season was the 42nd running of Basketball Ireland's premier men's basketball competition. The season featured 10 teams from across the Republic of Ireland and Northern Ireland, with the regular season beginning on 4 October 2014 and ending on 15 March 2015. In 2014–15, UCC Demons created history in Irish basketball by becoming the first side ever to remain undefeated for an entire season. They claimed the end-of-season Champions Trophy on 29 March 2015 to add to their League and Cup titles in a campaign that saw them win 24 games in a row. In a thrilling Champions Trophy final in Galway, Demons saw off Templeogue 85–73 behind the play of player-coach Colin O'Reilly.

Teams

Regular season

Standings

Source: Comortais

Champions Trophy

Bracket

*National League Division 1 champions.

**National League Division 1 runners-up.

Quarter-finals

Semi-finals

Final

National Cup

Round 1 (2 legs)

Round 2 (1 leg)
Winner of Series 4 vs Winner of Series 5

Semi-finals
Winner of Series 1 vs Winner of Series 2

Winner of Series 3 vs Winner of Round 2

Final

Source: Comortais

Awards

Player of the Month

Coach of the Month

Statistics leaders
Stats as of the end of the regular season

Regular season
 Player of the Year: Colin O'Reilly (UCC Demons)
 Young Player of the Year: Ciaran Roe (Killester)
 Coach of the Year: Colin O'Reilly (UCC Demons)
 All-Star First Picks:
 G: Kyle Hosford (UCC Demons)
 G: Conor Meany (UCD Marian)
 F: Ricky Taylor (Belfast Star)
 F: Colin O'Reilly (UCC Demons)
 C: Lehmon Colbert (UCC Demons)
 All-Star Second Picks:
 G: Isaac Westbrooks (Swords Thunder)
 G: Roy Downey (Neptune)
 F: Michael Goj (Swords Thunder)
 F: Juan Torres (Swords Thunder)
 C: Jason Killeen (Templeogue)
 All-Star Third Picks:
 G: Isaac Gordon (Templeogue)
 G: Kevin Lacey (Swords Thunder)
 F: Ciaran O'Sullivan (UCC Demons)
 F: Michael Bonaparte (Neptune)
 C: Jermaine Turner (Killester)

References

Irish
Super League (Ireland) seasons
Basket
Basket